Barbora Hlavsová is a 1942 Czech drama film directed by Martin Frič.

Plot
Hlavsa, the manager of a small-town pawn shop, commits embezzlement and shoots himself after being unable to get out of the situation. His mother takes in her widowed daughter-in-law and teenage grandson who assist her is paying for all the damage. Young Bořík, a gifted pianist, finds it hard to give up his dreams of being a concert pianist.

Cast
 Terezie Brzková as Barbora Hlavsová
 František Smolík as Vojtech Hlavsa
 Jiřina Štěpničková as Klára Hlavsová
 Jindřich Plachta as Zanta, pensioner
 Jaroslav Průcha as Prouza, city major
 Vladimír Řepa as Kvech, barber
 Stella Májová as Vlasta Kvechová
 František Filipovský as Bartyzal, jeweller
 Karel Dostal as Lukás Hlavsa, carver
 Eliška Kuchařová as Eliska
 Rudolf Hrušínský as Rysavý, miller
 Vilém Pfeiffer as Kaliba
 Eman Fiala as Weaver
 Václav Trégl as Oldrich, weaver

References

External links
 

1942 films
1942 drama films
1940s Czech-language films
Czech black-and-white films
Czechoslovak black-and-white films
Films directed by Martin Frič
Czechoslovak drama films
1940s Czech films